Frederick Regional Airport  is a city-owned, public-use airport located three nautical miles (6 km) southeast of the central business district of Frederick, a city in Tillman County, Oklahoma, United States. It was formerly known as Frederick Municipal Airport.

History
It was also used as a civil airport under a joint-use agreement. The airport was assigned to the United States Army Air Forces' Gulf Coast Training Center (later Central Flying Training Command) as an advanced twin-engine (level 3) pilot training airfield, with one of its instructors being comedian George Gobel. It had four local auxiliary airfields for emergency and overflow landings. The end of the AAFTC's pilot training program on October 31, 1945, marked the end of military flight operations from the airfield. On September 21, 1946, it was subsequently declared surplus and given to the Army Corps of Engineers. Eventually it was discharged to the War Assets Administration (WAA) and became a civil airport.

Facilities and aircraft
It has three runways:
17/35 is 6,099 by 150 feet (1,859 x 46 m) with an asphalt surface; 3/21 is 4,812 by 60 feet (1,467 x 18 m) with a concrete surface; 12/30 is 4,578 by 75 feet (1,395 x 23 m) with a concrete surface.

The airport is also home to the World War II Airborne Demonstration Team Foundation, a non-profit 501(c)(3) organization located in the historic former Frederick Army Airfield portion of the airport.  In addition to its museum functions focused on World War II U.S. Army airborne infantry/paratrooper operations, the team also maintains two flyable C-47 Skytrain transports in one of the airport's remaining World War II military hangars.  Painted in U.S. Army Air Forces markings, these aircraft are regularly flown for use in historical reenactments of paratrooper airdrop operations.

For the 12-month period ending June 9, 2008, the airport had 63,700 aircraft operations, an average of 174 per day: 94% military and 6% general aviation. At that time there were 17 aircraft based at this airport: 76% single-engine, 18% multi-engine and 6% military.

See also

 Oklahoma World War II Army Airfields
 33d Flying Training Wing (World War II)

References

External links
 Aerial photo as of 8 February 1995 from USGS The National Map
 

1942 establishments in Oklahoma
Airports established in 1942
Airports in Oklahoma
Airfields of the United States Army Air Forces in Oklahoma
Buildings and structures in Tillman County, Oklahoma
USAAF Central Flying Training Command
American Theater of World War II